The Southlands Arts Centre is a Queen Anne-style Grade II* listed building in West Drayton, with extensive grounds open to the public.

History

The Yiewsley and West Drayton Arts Council was established in 1964 after the London Government Act 1963 came into force. Its aim was to embed a strong cultural identity for the local area and the wider London Borough of Hillingdon. It acquired the tenure for what is now Southlands Arts Centre in 1965.

Yiewsley and West Drayton Urban District Council had acquired the property in 1963. Previous owners included playwright and novelist Cosmo Hamilton (1870–1942).

Events

Yiewsley and West Drayton Arts Council oversee a varied range of public activities at the venue: There are arts groups and classes, professional photography and art exhibitions; film, music, and drama events; textile design; and annual Craft and Victorian fayres.

Transport

Train
The closest train station is West Drayton. The station is a ten-minute walk away.

Buses
U3 bus (to the Green); 222, 350 and U5 buses to the High Street.

Car
In easy reach of the M4, M25 and M40.

References

Arts centres in London
Culture in London
Performing arts centres in the United Kingdom